Charles Bates "Tex" Thornton (July 22, 1913 – November 24, 1981) was an American business executive who was the founder of Litton Industries.

Early life
Charles Bates Thornton was born on July 22, 1913 in Goree, Texas.

Career
He served in the United States Army Air Forces during World War II, reaching the rank of Colonel and commanding a staff of officers in the office of statistical control. Following the war he offered the group of ten to several employers as an all-or-nothing proposition to provide the corporation with an analytical management team. Henry Ford II had recently taken over Ford Motor Company, which was in bad financial shape and had virtually non-existent financial control systems. He interviewed and hired the team, which became known as the "Whiz Kids". Seven of the ten went on to senior executive positions.

Thornton left Ford in 1948 to work for Hughes Aircraft. In 1953, he founded a company called Electro-Dynamics, then acquired the vacuum tube manufacturing business of Charles Litton, Sr. in 1953. In 1954, Electro-Dynamics also bought the rights to use the well-known "Litton" name. Through a series of mergers and acquisitions orchestrated by Thornton, Litton became a huge conglomerate with a wide range of products.

In 1966, Thornton received the Golden Plate Award of the American Academy of Achievement.

He was awarded the Presidential Medal of Freedom by President Ronald Reagan in October, 1981.

Philanthropy
The USC Thornton School of Music at the University of Southern California is named in honor of Thornton's widow, Flora L. Thornton, due in part to a $25 million donation she made in 1999. Thornton was a trustee and donor to the university for many years. The Thornton Center for Engineering Management at Stanford University is also named in honor of Thornton.
The Charles B. Thornton Administrative building on the campus of Pepperdine University stands as a tribute to the Thornton family.

Death
He died in November 1981. He was buried at the Arlington National Cemetery.

References

Bibliography

External links
 Tex Thornton page on Littoncorp website
 The Presidency Project
 

1913 births
1981 deaths
American manufacturing businesspeople
Burials at Arlington National Cemetery
People from Knox County, Texas
Texas Tech University alumni
United States Army Air Forces officers
United States Army Air Forces personnel of World War II
Recipients of the Medal of Freedom
20th-century American businesspeople
Presidential Medal of Freedom recipients
20th-century American philanthropists
People from Holmby Hills, Los Angeles
Military personnel from Texas